Māris Jass (born January 18, 1985) is a Latvian professional ice hockey forward. He is currently playing a free agent having last played for GKS Katowice of the Polska Hokej Liga.

Playing career
He started his career in Stalkers/Juniors of the Latvian Hockey League. After spending two seasons in the lower-tier Russian league, he spent the next six seasons with HK Liepājas Metalurgs, playing also for HC Lada Togliatti and HC Slavia Praha. In 2009-10 he played for HK Ardo Nitra of the Slovak Extraliga. Jass remained in Slovakia for 2010-11, signing with HK 36 Skalica, however in November he joined Neftekhimik Nizhnekamsk.

References

External links

1985 births
Living people
Buran Voronezh players
Dinamo Riga players
GKS Katowice (ice hockey) players
Gothiques d'Amiens players
Hannover Scorpions players
JKH GKS Jastrzębie players
HC Lada Togliatti players
Latvian ice hockey defencemen
HK Liepājas Metalurgs players
HC Neftekhimik Nizhnekamsk players
HK Nitra players
HC Nové Zámky players
Orli Znojmo players
Piráti Chomutov players
HK 36 Skalica players
HC Slavia Praha players
HC Slovan Bratislava players
Sportspeople from Daugavpils
HC Valpellice players
Latvian people of Georgian descent
Latvian expatriate sportspeople in France
Latvian expatriate sportspeople in Russia
Latvian expatriate sportspeople in Germany
Latvian expatriate sportspeople in the Czech Republic
Latvian expatriate sportspeople in Slovakia
Expatriate ice hockey players in Russia
Expatriate ice hockey players in the Czech Republic
Expatriate ice hockey players in France
Expatriate ice hockey players in Germany
Expatriate ice hockey players in Slovakia
Expatriate ice hockey players in Poland
Latvian expatriate sportspeople in Italy
Expatriate ice hockey players in Italy
Latvian expatriate ice hockey people